Edward Preston Murphy (March 13, 1904 – December 13, 1958) was a United States district judge of the United States District Court for the Northern District of California.

Education and career

Born in Austin, Nevada, Murphy received an Artium Baccalaureus degree from Santa Clara University in 1927. He received a Bachelor of Laws from Santa Clara University School of Law in 1928 and received a Juris Doctor from the same institution in 1932. He was a Professor of Law and Public Speaking for Santa Clara University from 1928 to 1932. He was in private practice of law in San Francisco, California from 1933 to 1942. He was a municipal judge in San Francisco from 1942 to 1945. He was a Judge of the Appellate Division of the Superior Court of California from 1945 to 1950.

Federal judicial service

Murphy was nominated by President Harry S. Truman on December 4, 1950, to the United States District Court for the Northern District of California, to a new seat created by 63 Stat. 493. He was confirmed by the United States Senate on December 13, 1950, and received his commission on December 21, 1950. His service was terminated on December 13, 1958, due to his death.

References

Sources
 

1904 births
1958 deaths
Santa Clara University alumni
Santa Clara University faculty
California state court judges
Judges of the United States District Court for the Northern District of California
United States district court judges appointed by Harry S. Truman
20th-century American judges
20th-century American lawyers